Pachythrix is a genus of moths of the family Noctuidae.

Species
 Pachythrix axia (Turner, 1941)
 Pachythrix chlorophylla (Zilli, 2020)
 Pachythrix esmeralda (Warren, 1912)
 Pachythrix hampsoni (Nye, 1975)
 Pachythrix mniochlora (Meyrick, 1889)
 Pachythrix smaragdistis (Hampson, 1908)

References
Natural History Museum Lepidoptera genus database
Pachythrix at funet

Hadeninae